Unit.js is an open source unit testing framework for the JavaScript programming language, running on Node.js and the browser.

Usage 

A simple hello world test looks like the code below.

  var example = 'Hello world!';

  test.string(example)
    .isEqualTo('Hello world!');

Support describe() and it(), describes a suite of tests and it() is an individual test specification. The name "it()" follows the idea of behavior-driven development and serves as the first word in the test name, which should be a complete sentence.

describe('Hello world', function() {
  it('says hello', function() {

    var example = 'Hello world!';

    test.string(example)
     .isEqualTo('Hello world!');
  });
});

Assertion styles 

Unit.js has multiple interfaces that allow the developer to choose the most comfortable and productive style.

Unit.js :

test.string(str)
  .number(num).is(42);

Assert :

test.assert(typeof str === 'string');
test.assert(typeof num === 'number');
test.assert.equal(num, 42);

Must.js :

test.must(str).be.a.string();
test.must(num).be.a.number();
test.must(num).equal(42);

Should.js :

test.should(str).be.a.String
test.should(num).be.Number
.and.equal(42);

See also 
 Unit testing
 List of unit testing frameworks
 List of JavaScript libraries
JavaScript framework
JavaScript library

References

External links 

 Unit.js website
 Unit.js on GitHub

JavaScript programming tools
Unit testing frameworks